Clara M. Cook Kellogg (December 30, 1861 – October 1, 1942) was an American political hostess. As wife of Senator, ambassador, and Secretary of State Frank B. Kellogg, she was socially prominent in Washington, D.C., and at the American embassy in London.

Early life 
Clara M. Cook was born in Rochester, Minnesota, the daughter of George Clinton Cook and Elizabeth Burns Cook. Her father was born in Vermont and her mother was born in Ireland. Cook was a teacher before she married.

Career 
During her time in London, she was considered "charming" and "well-dressed". She was honored by the American Women's Club in that city, and represented the ambassador at the opening of the American Hospital at Hampstead in 1924. She was especially close to Queen Mary of Teck.

In Minnesota, she served on the board of directors at the state children's home, Sheltering Arms. She was also a member of the Ramsey County Republican Woman's Club and the League of Protestant Women.

Personal life 
Cook married lawyer Kellogg in 1886. He died in 1937; she died in 1942, aged 80 years, in Saint Paul, Minnesota. Her ashes were placed with her husband's, behind a memorial stone in the Washington National Cathedral. The Minnesota Historical Society Library holds a collection of her papers, and a larger collection of her husband's papers.

References 

1861 births
1942 deaths
People from Rochester, Minnesota